Ari Ahonen (born February 6, 1981) is a Finnish former professional ice hockey goaltender. He was drafted in the first round, 27th overall, by the New Jersey Devils in the 1999 NHL Entry Draft. Ahonen is the only goaltender in SM-liiga history to have represented all three teams in the greater Helsinki area: HIFK, Jokerit and Blues.

Playing career
After playing three seasons in Finland's SM-liiga, representing JYP and HIFK, Ahonen joined the Devils' American Hockey League affiliate, the Albany River Rats. After five seasons with the River Rats, Ahonen returned to Finland in 2006 to represent Blues, but when he found himself serving as backup to Bernd Brückler, Ahonen signed with Jokerit when no less than three of their goaltenders were injured. With Jokerit Ahonen have won silver medals in 2007.

During the 2011–12 season Ahonen signed a two-year deal with Metallurg Magnitogorsk of the Kontinental Hockey League (KHL).

Ahonen later continued in the KHL, joining Kazakhstan based, Barys Astana, for the 2013–14 season.

Career statistics

Regular season

Awards and honours

References

External links

1981 births
Living people
Sportspeople from Jyväskylä
Albany River Rats players
Espoo Blues players
Finnish expatriate ice hockey players in Kazakhstan
Finnish expatriate ice hockey players in Russia
Finnish expatriate ice hockey players in Sweden
Finnish expatriate ice hockey players in the United States
Finnish ice hockey goaltenders
Frölunda HC players
HIFK (ice hockey) players
Jokerit players
National Hockey League first-round draft picks
New Jersey Devils draft picks
KalPa players
Barys Nur-Sultan players
Metallurg Magnitogorsk players